Zdeněk 'Sam' Simota (born 4 May 1985 in Prachatice, Czech Republic) is a Czech speedway rider. He rides in the Czech ExtraLeague with AK Plzeň, Polish Second Division League with Orzeł Łódź and the Danish Team Brovst.

Career
Simota began riding at the age of nine. The highlights of his career so far were becoming the Czech Under-21 Champion in 2004 and reaching the semi-final of the European Championships. He has been a meeting reserve in the Czech 2006 Speedway Grand Prix.

2005 saw the introduction of Simota into the British Premier League for the Reading Racers as an injury replacement for Danny Bird.  In 2007 he rode for the Racers in the Elite League.

During a race meet in Hungary in May 2008 Simota suffered serious injuries which ended his season. By 2009 he was back in training and rode for the Czech team AK Plzeň, the Polish team Orzel Lodz, and the Danish team Brovst.

References

External links

1985 births
Living people
Czech speedway riders
European Pairs Speedway Champions
Reading Racers riders
Peterborough Panthers riders